The 1928 Southern Illinois Maroons football team was an American football team that represented Southern Illinois Normal University (now known as Southern Illinois University Carbondale) in the Illinois Intercollegiate Athletic Conference (IIAC) during the 1928 college football season.  In its 12th season under head coach William McAndrew, the team compiled a 7–1–2 record.  The team played its home games at Normal Field in Carbondale, Illinois.

Schedule

References

Southern Illinois
Southern Illinois Salukis football seasons
Southern Illinois Maroons football